Patuan Bosar Sinambela ginoar Ompu Pulo Batu, better known as Si Singamangaraja XII (184917 June 1907), was the last priest-king of the Batak peoples of north Sumatra. In the course of fighting a lengthy guerrilla war against the Dutch colonisation of Sumatra from 1878 onwards, he was killed in a skirmish with Dutch troops in 1907. He was declared a National Hero of Indonesia in 1961 for his resistance to Dutch colonialism.

Biography

Si Singamangaraja XII was born Patuan Bosar Sinambela in Bakkara, Tapanuli, in 1849. He was the successor to his father Si Singamangaraja XI (Raja Sohahuaon Sinambela) who died in 1867.

The title Si Singamangaraja which was used by the family dynasty of Marga Sinambela means "The Great Lion King": (1) the (honorific particle Si from sanskrit Sri) (2) Great King (manga raja from sanskrit maharaja), (3) Lion (singa). Since the Batak see themselves in their mythology as descendants of divine blood (all Margas have the mythological god-king Si Raja Batak as their first ancestor), no feudalism structure could develop in that parmalim faith based concept of ethnic exceptionalism throughout Batak history. The king was merely seen as a ruler among equals ("primus inter pares" or in Batak law/adat "dalihan na tolo") and the South East Asian aristocratic lords, the Datuk (in Batak: Datu), did justify their leadership role within society by fulfilling their secular and religious tasks. They had for example to preside over courtship trials in cases of broken law, organize administrative affairs and similarly oversee in the function as a priest class all religious ceremonies within the village or territory of rulership (kedatuan); but there were, compared to the European nobility (Datu is equivalent to a European count or countess) and its characteristic excessive privileges, no further special rights beyond those functionally substantiated at hand.

Si Singamangaraja XII was the last in a line of figures known as parmalim (religious leaders). The Sisingamangaraja was believed to have powers such as the ability to drive away evil spirits, call forth the rain and control rice-growing. He was not normally seen as a political figure, but when Dutch colonists and missionaries began penetrating north Sumatra from the 1850s onwards both Sisingamangaraja XI and XII became the focus of Batak resistance to colonial rule. Although they were not personally anti-Christian, the two Sisingamangarajas faced pressure to act from traditional list Batak chiefs and the neighbouring Sultanate of Aceh, which was at war with the Dutch from 1873.

Resistance against the Dutch
In February 1878, Sisingamangaraja XII held a religious ceremony to rally the Bataks behind him in a war of resistance against the Dutch. His forces attacked Dutch outposts in Bakal Batu, Tarutung, but were defeated. He regrouped and launched a fresh offensive in 1883–84 with Acehnese aid, attacking the Dutch at Uluan and Balige in May 1883 and in Tangga Batu in 1884. The Dutch mounted a harsh response, torturing and killing Bataks suspected of being followers of Sisingamangaraja XII, as well as burning houses and imposing punitive taxes. They offered rewards for information on his whereabouts but were unable to capture him.

In 1904, Dutch forces under Lt Col Gotfried Coenraad Ernst van Daalen attacked Tanah Gayo and some areas around Lake Toba in order to break the Batak resistance. Sisingamangaraja XII's forces resorted to guerrilla warfare and evaded the Dutch troops. The Dutch reinforced their troops and weapons before launching another offensive in 1907 against the remainder of Sisingamangaraja XII's forces in the Toba region. A battle was fought at Pak-pak between the Dutch, led by Captain Hans Christoffel, and Sisingamangaraja's troops. On 17 June 1907 Sisingamangaraja XII was killed in a clash at Dairi along with his daughter Lopian and his sons, Patuan Nagari and Patuan Anggi.

He was buried in Tarutung, then moved to Balige, and later moved to Samosir Island.

Legacy

In 1961 Sisingamangaraja XII was declared a "National Hero of Indonesia" – specifically a "Hero of the Struggle for Freedom" (Pahlawan Perjuangan Kemerdekaan) – by the Indonesian government under Presidential Decree number 590.

He's also the namesake of "Sisingamangaraja" road in Jakarta where couple of important buildings are located, such as the ASEAN Secretariat building,  and several government owned buildings. It's also shared the name to Jakarta MRT "Sisingamangaraja" station, which were renamed to "ASEAN" station not long after the opening of the mass transit. Silangit International Airport is also named after him.

References

Bibliography
 
 
 
 
 
 
 
 

1849 births
1907 deaths
National Heroes of Indonesia
People of Batak descent
Deaths by firearm in Indonesia